Filip Stojilković (born 4 January 2000) is a Swiss professional footballer who plays for German  club Darmstadt 98.

Club career
On 31 January 2023, Stojilković signed a four-and-a-half-year contract with Darmstadt 98 in Germany.

Personal life
Born in Switzerland, Stojilković is of Serbian descent.

References

External links
SFL Profile
FC Sion Profile
SFV U21 Profile

2000 births
Swiss people of Serbian descent
People from Meilen District
Sportspeople from the canton of Zürich
Living people
Swiss men's footballers
Switzerland youth international footballers
Switzerland under-21 international footballers
Association football forwards
FC Zürich players
TSG 1899 Hoffenheim II players
FC Wil players
FC Sion players
FC Aarau players
SV Darmstadt 98 players
Swiss Promotion League players
Regionalliga players
Swiss Challenge League players
Swiss Super League players
2. Bundesliga players
Swiss expatriate footballers
Expatriate footballers in Germany
Swiss expatriate sportspeople in Germany